Ponto Novo is a municipality in the state of Bahia in the North-East region of Brazil. It was raised to municipality status in 1985, the area being taken out of the municipality of Caldeirão Grande.

See also
List of municipalities in Bahia

References

Municipalities in Bahia